Korina Maria Baluyot Sanchez-Roxas (born October 5, 1964), known professionally as Korina Sanchez, is a Filipino broadcast journalist, television news anchor, senior field correspondent, magazine show host, radio anchor, and newspaper columnist. She served as Chief Correspondent for the Integrated News and Current Affairs Division of ABS-CBN airing on TV Channel 2, AM Radio DZMM and cable TV ABS-CBN News Channel. 
She also has a regular column in The Philippine Star entitled That Does It, as well as a Tagalog column entitled K Ka Lang in its sister newspaper, Pilipino Star Ngayon.

She is married to Mar Roxas, the former Secretary of the Department of the Interior and Local Government. She transferred to TV5 Network after signing with Brightlight Productions.

Personal life 
Sanchez married Mar Roxas on October 27, 2009 in Quezon City. On February 12, 2019, her twin children with spouse, Mar Roxas, Pepe and Pilar were born via gestational surrogacy in the United States.

Education 
Sanchez finished high school at Saint Theresa's College of Quezon City. She attended Miriam College and graduated with a Bachelor of Arts degree in communication arts. She attended the Ateneo de Manila University, where she graduated with a master's degree in journalism on June 26, 2016.

Controversies 
In 2013, Sanchez drew flak among netizens due to her remarks on her now-defunct DZMM radio show Rated Korina on Anderson Cooper's reporting for Tacloban. She claimed that the journalist did not know what he was talking about. CNN news anchor Anderson Cooper was one of the first international correspondents on the ground in Tacloban to report on the aftermath of Typhoon Haiyan. Cooper responded to Sanchez by urging her to visit the area and insisted that his coverage was accurate.

On December 3, 2014 newscast of ABS-CBN's TV Patrol, Sanchez said she hoped Typhoon Ruby (international name for Typhoon Hagupit) would hit Japan instead of the Philippines: "Can’t they just get all of it?" Six weeks after this incident, Sanchez was removed from her radio show.

Presidential campaign 2016 

To gain support from the LGBT community for the 2016 presidential elections, Sánchez organized #KERIBEKS: The First National Gay Congress of The Philippines, which was a star studded concert held at the Araneta Coliseum (owned by the family of Mar Roxas) which featured job fairs but did not deal with LGBT issues nor did Mar Roxas vocalize support for the LGBT.

Awards, honors and recognition 
2016

30th PMPC Star Awards for Television
 Best Magazine Show
 Best Magazine Show Host
2013
Volunteers Against Crime and Corruption (VACC) Awards
 Outstanding Radio Anchor – Korina Sanchez

2012

Asian TV Awards
Best Current Affairs Presenter Category: Highly Commended, Korina Sanchez, Rated K (Episode: "Kwento ng Buhay Ko")

Media Newser Philippines’ Media Winner of 2012
 Ka Doroy Broadcaster of the Year Award, Korina Sanchez
 Best Magazine Host for TV, Korina Sanchez
 Best Public Affairs Program Host for Radio, Korina Sanchez
 Best Public Affairs Program, 'Tambalang Failon at Sanchez', DZMM
  Best Magazine Show, Rated K

References 

1964 births
ABS-CBN News and Current Affairs people
Araneta family
Miriam College alumni
Filipino radio journalists
Filipino television news anchors
Living people
Roxas family
Ateneo de Manila University alumni